John Gibson (born 20 April 1967) is a Scottish former footballer who is currently manager of Blantyre Victoria in the Scottish Junior Football Association, West Region. He has previously played in the Scottish Football League Premier Division for Hamilton Academical.

Career
Gibson began his playing career with hometown Junior club Blantyre Victoria and was picked up by nearby Hamilton Academical under the management of John Lambie. After making his debut for the club in the final Premier Division fixture of the 1986–87 season against Hibernian, Gibson made two further league appearances for Accies before joining Alloa Athletic. Gibson enjoyed lengthy spells at Alloa then Stirling Albion and also played for Stenhousemuir and Morton.

He was appointed as manager of Blantyre Victoria in June 2016.

References

External links

1967 births
Living people
Footballers from South Lanarkshire
Scottish footballers
Association football midfielders
Blantyre Victoria F.C. players
Hamilton Academical F.C. players
Alloa Athletic F.C. players
Stirling Albion F.C. players
Stenhousemuir F.C. players
Greenock Morton F.C. players
Auchinleck Talbot F.C. players
Scottish Junior Football Association players
Scottish Football League players
Scottish Junior Football Association managers
Scottish football managers
People from Blantyre, South Lanarkshire